Craigie Burn Nature Reserve, also known as Craigie Burn Dam Nature Reserve is located on the road between Mooi River and Greytown, in the KwaZulu-Natal, province of South Africa.

Wildlife

See also

References 

Protected areas of KwaZulu-Natal